Lupinus sulphureus (sulphur lupine, sulphur-flower lupine) is a species of lupine, a flowering plant of the legume family, Fabaceae.

Distribution
It is native to western North America from southern British Columbia south through Washington to Oregon. It is a perennial herbaceous plant growing to 40 to 80 cm tall. The leaves are palmately compound, with 7 to 13 leaflets each 2 to 5 cm long. The flowers are produced in whorls on a spike 12 to 20 cm long.

Taxonomy
There are three subspecies:
Lupinus sulphureus subsp. kincaidii (Kincaid's lupine; syn. L. oreganus subsp. kincaidii). Willamette Valley of western Oregon and parts of southwestern Washington. Flowers purple. Threatened.
Lupinus sulphureus subsp. subsaccatus. Southern British Columbia south to Oregon. Flowers purple.
Lupinus sulphureus subsp. sulphureus. Eastern Washington and eastern Oregon. Flowers yellow.

Ecology
Fender's blue butterfly, an endangered species, is host-specific on Kincaid's lupine. Its larvae eat the leaves during the fall and spend the winter among the roots. In spring, the larvae continue to feed on the leaves before pupating.

References

External links
Lupinus sulphureus. Plants of British Columbia.
Lupinus sulphureus. Burke Museum. University of Washington.
Lupinus sulphureus subsp. kincaidii. (as L. oreganus subsp. kincaidii). USDA PLANTS.

sulphureus
Flora of British Columbia
Flora of Oregon
Flora of Washington (state)